Celos may refer to:

Celos, a Spanish term for jealousy
"Celos" (song), a 1983 song by Daniela Romo
"Celos", a song by Marc Anthony song from his 2001 album Libre
Celos (film), a 1946 Argentine drama film directed by Mario Soffici 
Jealousy (1999 film) or Celos, a 1999 Spanish drama film directed by Vicente Aranda

See also
Jealousy (disambiguation)